C.J. Tywoniak (born February 20, 1990) is an American electric guitarist and Paul Green's student.

Biography
Born on February 20, 1990 in San Mateo, California, Tywoniak was portrayed in the rock music documentary film Rock School as a "guitarist who can play better than most of the guitarists seen on Saturday Night Live." As a twelve-year-old in the movie that was filmed from 2002 to 2003 and produced in 2005, he played riffs from Carlos Santana, Frank Zappa and The Kinks. After the movie's release, he was invited to perform on MTV's Total Request Live. 

He has studied with Joe Stump and has played with Jon Anderson, Adrian Belew, Ike Willis, John Wetton, Max Johnston, Brad Roberts, Peter Frampton, Alice Cooper and Eddie Vedder. 

Tywoniak received a scholarship offer from the Berklee College of Music and was accepted at the University of Miami. Roger Ebert suggested he could have been destined for the Juilliard School. He is currently attending the University of Miami and teaching at the Paul Green's School of Rock in Downingtown, Pennsylvania, in his free time. He also appeared in the 2012 film Rock of Ages.

References

External links
 Official Website
 

1990 births
American rock musicians
Living people
People from San Mateo, California
American male guitarists
21st-century American guitarists
21st-century American male musicians